Samantha Shaw (born 1957) is an American politician.

Samantha Shaw may also refer to:

Samantha Shaw (designer) of Wedding dress of Sophie Rhys-Jones
Samantha Shaw (Person of Interest)
Samantha Shaw (actress) in Brady's Beasts

See also
Sam Shaw (disambiguation)